Denys Molchanov and Aleksandr Nedovyesov were the defending champions and successfully defended their title, defeating Robert Galloway and Alex Lawson 6–4, 7–6(7–2) in the final.

This was the second edition of the tournament and second of two editions of the tournament to start the 2021 ATP Challenger Tour year.

Seeds

Draw

References

External links
 Main draw

Antalya Challenger II - Doubles